Nicholas Monroe and Eric Nunez were the defending champions, but decided to not compete this year.
Vasek Pospisil and Adil Shamasdin defeated Guillermo Olaso and Pere Riba 7–6(7), 6–0 in the final.

Seeds

Draw

Draw

References
 Doubles Draw

Challenger Varonil Britania Zavaleta - Doubles
Challenger Britania Zavaleta
Mex